Jean-Pierre "J.P." Dumont (born April 1, 1978) is a Canadian former professional ice hockey forward who played in the National Hockey League for the Chicago Blackhawks, Buffalo Sabres, and Nashville Predators. Dumont was hired as the head coach of the Tier I Nashville Junior Predators 15u, based in Franklin, Tennessee, in 2016.

Playing career

Amateur
As a youth, Dumont played in the 1992 Quebec International Pee-Wee Hockey Tournament with the Montreal Canadiens minor ice hockey team.

Dumont played four seasons for Val-d'Or Foreurs in the Quebec Major Junior Hockey League. Roberto Luongo, Francis Lessard, Steve Bégin and Jean-Luc Grand-Pierre were teammates at Val-d'Or who have also made it to the NHL.

Professional

Dumont was drafted third overall the 1996 NHL Entry Draft by the New York Islanders. In 1998, a contract dispute between Dumont and the team led to the Islanders to trade him to the Chicago Blackhawks along with a fifth round pick in exchange for Dmitri Nabokov. In March 2000, he was traded by the Blackhawks to the Buffalo Sabres. Dumont, Doug Gilmour and a draft pick went to the Buffalo Sabres in exchange for Michal Grosek.

In August 2006, he signed a two-year, $4.5-million contract with the Nashville Predators after the Buffalo Sabres rejected Dumont's $2.9-million arbitration award.

During the 2007–08 season, Dumont was signed by the Predators to a four-year, $16-million contract extension.

On October 17, 2008, Dumont scored his 400th point in a game against the Columbus Blue Jackets.

In the 2010-11 season, Dumont posted just 19 points in 70 games with the Predators, his lowest point total since coming to Nashville. Consequently, on June 30, 2011, the day before free agency, the Predators bought out Dumont, making him an unrestricted free agent for July 1. In ending his tenure with the Predators, Dumont left the franchise placing fifth in all-time scoring with 267 points in 388 games.

With limited NHL interest, on October 21, 2011, he signed a one-year contract with Swiss team SC Bern of the National League A. Marking a return after playing 13 games for Bern during the 2004–05 NHL lockout. In his final professional season in 2011–12, Dumont contributed to the offence at a point-per-game average, helping Bern reach the Championship finals.

Personal
J.P. is married to Kristin and has four daughters: Ella, Ava, Laila and Mya.

In 2010, Dumont generously donated items to the Brewer, Maine, youth hockey program, by-way of (now former) Maine State Representative Chris Greeley, who served for a number of years in the Maine Legislature with Dumont's father-in-law, a state senator.

Career statistics

Regular season and playoffs

Innternational

See also
List of Nashville Predators players

References

External links

1978 births
Buffalo Sabres captains
Buffalo Sabres players
Canadian expatriate ice hockey players in Switzerland
Canadian ice hockey right wingers
Canadian people of French descent
Chicago Blackhawks players
Chicago Wolves (IHL) players
Cleveland Lumberjacks players
Ice hockey people from Montreal
Living people
Nashville Predators players
National Hockey League first-round draft picks
New York Islanders draft picks
Portland Pirates players
Rochester Americans players
SC Bern players
Val-d'Or Foreurs players